The Maldives national Under-20 football team, also known as Maldives Under-20s or Maldives U20(s), is considered to be the feeder team for the Maldives national football team, and is controlled by the Football Association of Maldives.

Recent results & Fixtures

See also
 Maldives national football team

References

External links
Football Association of Maldives - Official website

Asian national under-20 association football teams
under-20